The Musha Incident, also known as the Wushe Rebellion and several other similar names, began in October 1930 and was the last major uprising against colonial Japanese forces in Japanese Taiwan. In response to long-term oppression by Japanese authorities, the Seediq Indigenous group in Musha (Wushe) attacked the village, killing over 130 Japanese. In response, the Japanese led a relentless counter-attack, killing over 600 Seediq in retaliation. The handling of the incident by the Japanese authorities was strongly criticised, leading to many changes in Aboriginal policy.

Background
Previous armed resistance to Japanese imperial authority had been dealt with sternly, as evident in responses to previous uprisings such as the Tapani Incident, which resulted in a cycle of rebel attacks and strict Japanese retaliation.  However, by the 1930s, armed resistance had largely been replaced by organised political and social movements among the younger Taiwanese generation. Direct police involvement in local administration had been relaxed, many stern punishments were abolished, and some elements of self-government, albeit of questionable effectiveness, had been introduced to colonial Taiwan.

However, a different approach was used in order to control Taiwan's Indigenous Peoples. Tribes were 'tamed' through assimilation, the process of disarming traditional hunting tribes and forcing them to relocate to the plains and lead an agrarian existence. Further resistance was then dealt with by military campaigns, isolation and containment. In order to access natural resources in mountainous and forested indigenous-controlled areas, Governor-General Sakuma Samata adopted a more aggressive terrain policy, attempting to pacify or eradicate Aboriginal groups in areas scheduled for logging within five years; by 1915, this policy had been largely successful, although resistance still existed in more remote areas.

Proximal causes
The Seediq people in the vicinity of Musha had been considered by Japanese authorities to be one of the most successful examples of this "taming" approach, with Chief Mouna Rudao being one of 43 indigenous leaders selected for a tour of Japan a few years earlier.  However, resentment still lingered, due largely to police misconduct, the continuing practice of forced labor, and the lack of respect for Indigenous beliefs and customs.

In the days immediately prior to the incident, Chief Mona Rudao held a traditional wedding banquet for his son Daho Mona, during which animals were slaughtered and wine was prepared and drunk. A Japanese police officer named Katsuhiko Yoshimura was on patrol in the area, and was offered a cup of wine by Daho Mona as a symbolic gesture. The officer refused, saying that Daho Mona's hands were soiled with blood from the slaughtered animals. Daho Mona attempted to take hold of the officer, insisting he participate, and the officer struck him with his stick. Fighting ensued, and the officer was injured. Chief Mona Rudao attempted to apologize by presenting a flagon of wine at the officer's house, but was rejected. The simmering resentment among the Seediq in Musha was finally pushed to the limit.

Incident

On 27 October 1930, hundreds of Japanese converged on Musha for an athletics meet at the elementary school. Shortly before dawn, Mona Rudao led over 300 Seediq warriors in a raid of strategic police sub-stations to capture weapons and ammunition. They then moved on to the elementary school, concentrating their attack on the Japanese in attendance. A total of 134 Japanese, including women and children, were killed in the attack. Two Han Taiwanese dressed in Japanese clothing were also mistakenly killed, one of whom was a girl wearing a Japanese kimono. Most of the victims were beheaded. The Aboriginals aimed to only kill Japanese specifically.

Consequences
The Japanese authorities responded with unprecedentedly harsh military action. A press blackout was enforced, and Governor General Ishizuka Eizō ordered a counter-offensive of two thousand troops to be sent to Musha, forcing the Seediq to retreat into the mountains and carry out guerrilla attacks by night. Unable to root out the Seediq despite their superior numbers and firepower, the Japanese faced a political need for a faster solution. Consequently, Japan's army air corps in Taiwan ordered bombing runs over Musha to smoke out the rebels, dropping mustard gas bombs in violation of the Geneva Protocol in what was allegedly the first such use of chemical warfare in Asia. The uprising was swiftly quelled, with any remaining resistance suppressed by the third week of December 1930; Mona Rudao had committed suicide on November 28, but the uprising had continued under other leaders. Of the 1,200 Seediq directly involved in the uprising, 644 died, 290 of whom committed suicide to avoid dishonour.

Due to internal and external criticism of their handling of the incident, Ishizuka and Hitomi Jirō, his chief civil administrator, were forced to resign in January 1931. However, Ishizuka's replacement, Ōta Masahiro, also took a harsh approach to controlling Taiwan's Indigenous Peoples: certain tribes were disarmed and left unprotected, giving their Aboriginal enemies an opportunity to annihilate them on behalf of the Japanese administration. Around 500 of the Seediq involved in the Musha Incident surrendered and were subsequently confined to a village near Musha. However, on 25 April 1931, Indigenous groups working with the Japanese authorities attacked the village, beheading all remaining males over the age of 15. This is known as the "Second Musha Incident".

However, the uprising did affect a change in the authorities' attitudes and approaches towards Aboriginals in Taiwan. Musha had been regarded as the most "enlightened and compliant" of the Aboriginal territories, and the colonial power's inability to prevent the massacre provoked a fear of similar nationalist movements starting in Taiwan, Korea, and Japan itself. A change in policy was clearly needed. Furthermore, Japanization education was intensified, promoting Japanese culture and loyalty to the emperor in the younger generation.

During the Musha Incident, the Seediq under Mona Rudao revolted against the Japanese, while the Truku and Toda did not. The rivalry of the Seediq versus the Toda and Truku was aggravated by Musha Incident, since the Japanese had long played them off against each other. Seediq land was given to the Truku (Taroko) and Toda by the Japanese after the incident.

In the media
The Musha Incident has been depicted three times in movies, in 1957 in the film Qing Shan bi xue, in the 2003 TV drama , and in the 2011 Taiwanese film Seediq Bale. 

The Chinese novel Remains of Life (originally published in Chinese in 1999, published in English translation in 2017) is a fictionalized account of the aftermath of this incident.

See also

 History of Taiwan
 Mona Rudao

References

Further reading

Conflicts in 1930
Rebellions in Asia
Taiwan under Japanese rule
1930 in Japan
1930 in Taiwan
Combat incidents
Taiwanese aboriginal culture and history
Violence against indigenous peoples
Seediq people
Truku people
October 1930 events
November 1930 events
December 1930 events
Military operations involving chemical weapons
Mass suicides
Military history of Taiwan
Military history of Japan